Advancing Australia is an Australian documentary television series that premiered on 27 March 2021 on Network Ten and is hosted by actor Guy Pearce. In each episode, the show focuses on an Australian national issue and how innovators have tried to use their skills to solve the issue, create change and a better place.

The series was sponsored by AGL.

Episodes

Notes

References

External links
Official website - 10Play
Official website - Production
Production website
Ben Gartland — Advancing Australia

2021 Australian television series debuts
Australian factual television series
Network 10 original programming
Television shows set in New South Wales
English-language television shows